The 1998 Italian Grand Prix was a Formula One motor race held at Monza on 13 September 1998. The race was won by Michael Schumacher. This was also the last win for tyre manufacturer Goodyear in Formula One.

It was a dramatic race, Häkkinen got a blinding start pushing his way past Jacques Villenueve and Michael Schumacher on the front row, at same time it was a dreadful start for Schumacher who fell down to 5th, soon after he passed Villeneuve for 4th then Irvine for 3rd.

Häkkinen was struggling with a developing brake issue soon after and he waved his teammate Coulthard through, but soon after Coulthard's engine blew and seconds later Schumacher, who had caught Häkkinen, passed the Finn when Häkkinen had adjusted his brake bias forwards to cope with the brake problem and ran wide due to the smoke from Coulthard's engine.

Villeneuve running very low downforce soon spun out of the race, and Häkkinen started catching Schumacher again. Häkkinen was just three seconds behind with a handful of laps remaining, but then his rear brakes failed, sending him into a wild spin at the Roggia chicane. He was able to keep his engine running and kept going, but at the beginning of the next lap he went off again at the first Rettifilo chicane, and Irvine reeled him in and took 2nd off him. Soon after Ralf Schumacher caught and over took Häkkinen who was able to limp home in 4th.

It was a jubilant scene for the Italian crowd as Michael Schumacher came home first and his Ferrari teammate Eddie Irvine took second with Ralf Schumacher third, meaning the Jordan team had finished on all three podium places in two races.

Michael Schumacher was now level on points with Mika Häkkinen going into the Nürburgring, the penultimate round, though Häkkinen still led the championship on countback.

This race was Scuderia Ferrari's 600th start in a World Championship event as a team.

Classification

Qualifying

Race

Championship standings after the race
Bold text indicates who still has a theoretical chance of becoming World Champion.

Drivers' Championship standings

Constructors' Championship standings

 Note: Only the top five positions are included for both sets of standings.

References

External links

Italian Grand Prix
Italian Grand Prix
Grand Prix
Grand Prix